Phaq'u Q'awa is a  mountain in the Cordillera Occidental in the Andes of Bolivia. It is situated in the Oruro Department, Sabaya Province, Sabaya Municipality. Phaq'u Q'awa lies southeast of Wila Qullu.

The river Phaq'u Q'awa (Pacocahua) originates southwest of the mountain. It flows to the north as a right tributary of the Lauca River.

Name
The Hispanicized spelling is Pacocahua or Pajojañua.

References

Mountains of Oruro Department